Edith Skinner (née Warman; 22 September 1902 – 25 July 1981) was a vocal coach and a consultant to actors. Her book, Speak With Distinction, has been reprinted several times, promoting actors' use of what she called "Good American Speech".

Life 

Skinner was born in Moncton, New Brunswick, in eastern Canada, on 22 September 1902, to Herbert Havelock Warman and his wife Agnes Lynn, née Orr. She attended the Leland Powers School for the Spoken Word in Boston, Massachusetts, in the United States, and graduated in 1923. There she met Margaret Prendergast McLean, and through her, William Tilly, whose assistant she became in 1926. She studied at Columbia University, where she obtained a bachelor's degree in 1930 and a master's in 1931.

From 1937 to 1974, Skinner was on the faculty of the Carnegie Institute of Technology (later Carnegie-Mellon University) in Pittsburgh. She also taught at the Juilliard Theater Center in New York, the American Conservatory Theater in San Francisco, and at the University of Wisconsin.

She died in Milwaukee on 25 July 1981.

Writings 

Skinner wrote Speak with Distinction: Exercises, which was published in 1942 and has been reprinted several times. Collections of her papers are held by the New York Public Library in New York City, and by the University of Pittsburgh.

References 

1902 births
1981 deaths
Vocal coaches
Writers from Moncton
Carnegie Mellon University faculty
20th-century Canadian women writers
20th-century Canadian non-fiction writers
Columbia University alumni
Canadian women non-fiction writers
Canadian expatriates in the United States